Amydropa anophthalma is a species of beetle in the family Silvanidae, the only species in the genus Amydropa. Some taxonomies place it in the family Cryptophagidae.

References

Silvanidae